Right Of Way/21st Street station  is a light rail stop on the Muni Metro J Church line, located in the Dolores Heights neighborhood of San Francisco, California. The stop, which opened with the line on August 11, 1917, is located on a short rail-only right of way that allows the line to avoid the steep hill on Church Street to the west. The stop has a pair of side platforms located south of 21st Street on a sharp curve. The stop is not accessible to people with disabilities.

A shelter on the eastbound platform, a stucco structure with tile roof, was boarded up around 2010.

In March 2014, Muni released details of the proposed implementation of their Transit Effectiveness Project (later rebranded MuniForward), which included a variety of stop changes for the J Church line. No changes were proposed to the 21st Street stop.

References

External links 

SFMTA – Right Of Way/21st St: inbound, outbound
SF Bay Transit (unofficial): Right Of Way/21st St

Muni Metro stations
Railway stations opened in 1917